CRCC may refer to:
 China Railway Construction Corporation, and its subsidiary
 China Railway Construction Corporation Limited
 China Railways Test and Certification Center
 CRCC Asia
 Civilian Review and Complaints Commission for the Royal Canadian Mounted Police